Edward Fairfax Taylor (10 July 1845 – 27 January 1902) was an English first-class cricketer active 1865–67 who played for Surrey. He was born in Holborn; died in Ewell.

References

1845 births
1902 deaths
English cricketers
Surrey cricketers